Stenoma compsocoma is a moth in the family Depressariidae. It was described by Edward Meyrick in 1930. It is found in Pará, Brazil.

The wingspan is 14–16 mm. The forewings are light violet grey. The hindwings are grey.

References

Moths described in 1930
Taxa named by Edward Meyrick
Stenoma